Arvis Liepiņš (born 18 March 1990) is a Latvian cross-country skier. He competed at the FIS Nordic World Ski Championships 2011 in Oslo, the FIS Nordic World Ski Championships 2013 in Val di Fiemme, and at the 2014 Winter Olympics in Sochi.

References

External links
 
 
 
 
 

1990 births
Living people
Cross-country skiers at the 2014 Winter Olympics
Latvian male cross-country skiers
Olympic cross-country skiers of Latvia
People from Madona Municipality